Eucalyptus corynodes is a species of tree that is endemic to Queensland. It has hard, dark grey "ironbark", lance-shaped to curved adult leaves, flower buds usually on a branching inflorescence, the buds in groups of seven, white flowers and barrel-shaped to cup-shaped fruit.

Description
Flowering occurs from June to August and the flowers are white. The fruit is a woody, barrel-shaped to cup-shaped capsule with the valves enclosed in the fruit.

Taxonomy and naming
Eucalyptus corynodes was first formally described in 1994 by Anthony Bean and Ian Brooker from a specimen collected near Cracow and the description was published in the journal Austrobaileya. The specific epithet (corynodes) is an Ancient Greek word meaning "clublike", referring to the shape of the buds.

Distribution and habitat
This eucalypt grows on rocky ridges in shallow soil between Rolleston, Eidsvold, Cracow and Monto with a disjunct population in the Roma-Surat area.

Conservation status
This species is listed as "least concern" under the Queensland Government Nature Conservation Act 1992.

See also
List of Eucalyptus species

References

Trees of Australia
corynodes
Myrtales of Australia
Flora of Queensland
Plants described in 1994
Taxa named by Ian Brooker